Abramelin is an Australian death metal band, which formed as Acheron in 1988 and were one of the first such groups in the country. They were a main influence on the development of Australian heavy metal music in the early 1990s. The name change occurred in 1994 to avoid confusion with a similarly named international group; the new name was adopted from The Book of Abramelin, which concerns a mage of the same name. Members of Abramelin have also been in Blood Duster, The Berzerker, The Amenta, and Akercocke. 
Abramelin supported tours by Napalm Death (1995), Paradise Lost, Cathedral (March 1996) and Cradle of Filth (2001). They released two studio albums, Abramelin (1995) and Deadspeak (2000), before disbanding in 2002. Abramelin reformed in 2016. In May 2020 the band released their third album Never Enough Snuff.

Acheron 

Abramelin were formed in Melbourne in 1988 under the name Acheron as a death metal group by David Abbott on guitars, Derek Ackary on bass guitar, Jason Black on guitars, Michael Colton on drums and Simon Dower on lead vocals. Tim Aldridge replaced Black and the band recorded a demo track, "Eternal Suffering", before Jason Dutton and Justin Wornes took the places of Colton and Ackary. French label Corpsegrinder Records released a three-track EP, "Deprived of Afterlife", in 1991, with the line-up of Abbott on lead guitar, Aldridge on lead guitars, Dower on lead vocals, Dutton on drums and Wornes on bass guitar.

Australian musicologist, Ian McFarlane, noticed their "dark, heavy sound owed much to European and American death metal groups such as Bathory, Entombed, Obituary, Therion, Immolation and General Surgery." They were a part of the early "death/grindcore/thrash metal scene" in the late 1980s to early 1990s. In September 2008 Dower told Chris Archer of Vomitose that Acheron's sound had progressed by "learning how to play our instruments and sing helped a lot. At that time we were all listening to early demos of Carnage, Entombed, Grave, Morbid Angel, etc., all of which had a definite influence on our song writing and overall sound, that and just the natural progression of the band’s direction." A track from their EP later appeared on the Dutch compilation album, Appointment with Fear.

Following the release of the EP, Dutton was replaced by Craig Bailey. In 1992 after Abbott left, he was temporarily replaced by Jason Kells (of Australian doom band, diSEMBOWELMENT) who, in turn, was replaced by Mark Schuliga, bass player for the similarly aligned Necrotomy. In November 1993 Acheron supported United Kingdom extreme metallers, Carcass, on the Australian leg of that group's Heartwork Tour: Supreme Blitz to Downunder. They also supported tours by Morbid Angel and Pungent Stench. Bailey left in 1993 and was replaced by Euan Heriot. The group had found that an American black metal band also had the name, Acheron. Hence, inspired by The Book of Abramelin, which concerns a 14th-century alchemist-mage, the group took up their new name.

Renamed 

Abramelin's first release under that name was in 1994: a four-track EP, Transgression from Acheron, after which Schuliga departed. Thrust Records, a subsidiary of Australian label, Shock Records, issued their debut studio album of the same name in 1995. McFarlane felt their "sound had taken on a sludge-like heaviness only matched by the likes of Brisbane band Misery." Abramelin supported tours by Napalm Death (1995), Paradise Lost and Cathedral (March 1996). The CD was withdrawn from sale in Western Australia due to explicit lyrics dealing with sexual violence against children and necrophilia. Rob Mollica, the drummer with a Melbourne death metal band, Earth, joined Abramelin as a guitarist but Heriot soon departed to uphold commitments with two other bands he was also playing drums for, Blood Duster and Fracture. Ex-Blood Duster drummer Matt Rizzo took Heriot's place on drums, in Abramelin, for a brief stint but after the break-up of Damaged he too was replaced, by Matt "Skitz" Sanders (Sadistik Exekution).

Late in 1997, Abramelin featured at Metal for the Brain, an Australian heavy metal festival. Spanish label, Repulse Records, picked up the debut for wider release but gave it almost no promotional support. Abramelin was re-released in Australia with Transgression from Acheron included, and this time without a lyric sheet in the packaging to avoid it being banned for a second time.

After this Abramelin were dormant as a live band for a few years. Their second album Deadspeak was gradually recorded, originally with drums by Sanders although his tracks were later re-recorded using a drum machine. It was released in 2000 on Shock, which featured only Dower on vocals and Aldridge performing all the music. With the live line-up of Aldridge, Dower, Rizzo, Grant Karajic on bass guitar and Matt Wilcock on guitar; Abramelin supported Cradle of Filth and again played at Metal for the Brain. Following this however, the group effectively disbanded. Further recording was rumoured but no new material emerged. Wilcock moved to Steel Affliction and The Berzerker, and then was with UK black/death metal band, Akercocke. Rizzo again became a member of Blood Duster.

On 21 October 2013 Abramelin issued a 3× CD, compilation album, Transgressing the Afterlife – The Complete Recordings 1988–2002. Kev Rowland of Metal Music Archives described its "total length is nearly four hours long! It is clearly a labour of love, and one thing that really impressed me is the quality of the sound throughout. Normally when faced with complete sets like this, much of it is of interest just for the historical context as opposed to playing this for pleasure (step forward Autopsy for example). But, even the rehearsal tracks sound as if they were recorded with a view for possible release as the sound is good and clear."

In 2016, reformed with the line-up of Dower, Aldridge, Wilcock, Mollica and Psycroptic drummer Dave Haley for some live dates. The band's third album, Never Enough Snuff, was released on May 15, 2020.

Band members

Current members
Simon Dower – vocals 
Tim Aldridge – guitars , bass 
Rob Wog – bass , guitars 
Matt Wilcock – guitars 
Dave Haley – drums

Former members
Jason Black – guitars 
Derek Ackary – bass 
David Abbott – guitars 
Michael Colton – drums 
Jason Kells – guitars 
Justin Warnes – bass 
Jason Dutton – drums 
Craig Bailey – drums 
Mark Shuliga – guitars 
Euan Heriot – drums 
Matt Rizzo – drums 
Matt "Skitz" Sanders – drums 
Grant Karajic – bass 
Lance Lembrin – drums

Timeline

Discography

Studio albums
Abramelin (1995)
Deadspeak (2000)
Never Enough Snuff (2020)

EPs
Deprived of Afterlife (1991)
Transgression from Acheron (1994)

Compilations
Transgressing the Afterlife – The Complete Recordings 1988–2002 (21 October 2013)

Demos
Eternal Suffering (1990)
Promo 1992 (1992)

References

Musical groups established in 1988
Victoria (Australia) musical groups
Australian heavy metal musical groups
Australian death metal musical groups
Musical groups disestablished in 2001